Alan Rhodes (born 5 January 1946) is an English former professional footballer who played as a wing half.

Career
Born in Bradford, Rhodes joined Bradford City from Salts in July 1964. He made 7 league and 2 cup appearances for the club, before moving to Bradford (Park Avenue) in October 1965. He later played for Ossett Albion.

Sources

References

1946 births
Living people
English footballers
Salts F.C. players
Bradford City A.F.C. players
Bradford (Park Avenue) A.F.C. players
Ossett Albion A.F.C. players
English Football League players
Association football wing halves